Clarence Leroy "Bags" Wanamaker was an American ice hockey player and coach who was active in the 1910s and 1920s.

Career
Wanamaker began attending Dartmouth College in the fall of 1911 and played for the freshman ice hockey team. While catching for the baseball team, he jumped up to the varsity ice hockey squad just in time for the arrival of Fred Rocque as head coach and led the team in scoring when it set a new program record with an 8–2 record. He followed that up with a 20-goal season while Dartmouth was again near the top of the college hockey world. In his senior season the Rover only posted 6 goals and the team finished with a losing record, but they were able to finally get wins over both Princeton and Harvard.

After graduating Wanamaker signed a contract with the New York Giants as a catcher but he never appeared in a game for the club. Wanamaker returned to his alma mater to serve as head coach after Roque left and remained with the program until 1920. In 1921 he became the head coach for Yale and led a renaissance for the program, winning back-to-back Intercollegiate Championships in 1924 and 1925. The two titles were the catalyst for convincing Yale to promote the ice hockey team to 'major' status in 1926. After a runner-up finish in 1928 Wanamaker resigned and turned over coaching duties to one of his former players, Lawrence Noble.

The 18 wins Yale earned in 1924 were a program record for over 60 years.

Statistics

Regular season and playoffs

Note: Assists were not recorded as an official statistic.

Head coaching record

References

External links
 

1892 births
1979 deaths
American men's ice hockey centers
Dartmouth Big Green men's ice hockey coaches
Dartmouth Big Green men's ice hockey players
Ice hockey coaches from Massachusetts
People from Wakefield, Massachusetts
Sportspeople from Middlesex County, Massachusetts
Yale Bulldogs men's ice hockey coaches
Ice hockey players from Massachusetts